Kalateh-ye Nazar (also Romanized as Kalāteh-ye Naẓar) is a village in Darmian Rural District, in the Central District of Darmian County, South Khorasan Province, Iran. At the 2006 census, its population was 175, in 41 families.

References 

Populated places in Darmian County